Michelle Monique Reis (born Michele Monique Reis, 20 June 1970) is a Hong Kong former actress, model, and beauty queen of Portuguese-Macanese and Shanghainese descent. In 1988, she won the Miss Chinese International Pageant and Miss Hong Kong beauty pageants. Afterward, she became one of Hong Kong's most prominent actresses in the 1990s, preferring to act in more introspective, higher-quality movies that often were independent films.

Reis often played dynamic characters, with a significant number of her roles centering around characters deemed more "difficult" to portray in Hong Kong cinema, such as prostitutes, femme fatales, and professional killers. Known for her youthful beauty and often deemed "one of the most beautiful women in Asia", Reis has continued to remain in the public eye long after her film career subsided in the early 2000s. Outside of the Chinese-speaking world, she is most famous for her role as the Hitman's Assistant in Fallen Angels (1995), which brought her critical acclaim internationally, as well as status as a cult film character and saw her nominated for “Best Actress” at the 1996 Golden Bauhinia Awards.

Early life
Reis was born in Macau, then a Portuguese colony, on 20 June 1970 as Michele Monique Reis. She did not acquire her Chinese name, Lee Ka Yan or Li Jiaxin (李嘉欣), until after elementary school. She is of mixed ancestry; her father, Francis Reis, was a Hong Kong-born ethnically Portuguese Macanese, and her mother, Wu Guofang (Chinese: 吴国芳), is Chinese and was raised in Shanghai before moving to British Hong Kong after World War II. Reis also has an older sister, born in August 1962, known as "Yuet Chi" (Joanna Francisca Reis or Li Jiaming; 李嘉明). She is Catholic. 

Her father, a member of the Hong Kong Volunteers, was captured by the Japanese when defending Hong Kong in 1940 during World War II and was imprisoned by the Imperial Japanese Army in the Sham Shui Po concentration camp for two years. Francis was reportedly popular and well-liked by the other prisoners. Still, because of his height, he was sent to work in coal mines in Sendai, Japan, until Japan's surrender. After the liberation of Hong Kong in 1945, he returned to Hong Kong, married Michelle's mother, and entered a business career.

In 1973, a modeling scout discovered Reis, and she was subsequently shot in a one-time baby advertisement.

Reis recalls her childhood as an unhappy one. She recalls her childhood being devoid of toys or new clothes and dominated by "her mother's tears and parents' endless bickering". Her father became more absent, resulting in Reis being raised primarily by her mother. Francis Reis was unsuccessful in his career, "achieving nothing", resulting in the family living in poverty. Wu Guofang, Reis' mother, worked two jobs a day to provide for the family. The family lived in a tin roof house, which they built themselves and was typical of Hong Kong's impoverished, and then lived in the highly dense and impoverished Chungking Mansions. Conditions at the tin roof house were very poor, with summers being extremely hot and rain easily dripping through cracks in their roof.

In 1980, at the age of 10, Reis’ father ran away from the family household because of an affair he was having, reportedly an affair abroad. By the end of his lifetime, he would come to have had three marriages and four children.  Reis has also stated that in childhood, she did not pay attention to her appearance, and that in elementary school she wore large myopic glasses.

In 1982, when she was 12, Reis filmed a second advertisement.

At 14, she began part-time studies as a student, which her mother emphasized, completing these studies by modelling part-time. During her studies, modelling scouts offered her casting and commercial film opportunities, but Reis declined as she wanted to be a flight attendant. Reis attended Maryknoll Convent School and matriculated from St. Paul's Secondary School throughout her studies. At Maryknoll Convent School, she received excellent grades, with 2A (English, Bible) results and ranking 7B in the five-year secondary education graduation exam.

As Reis and her sister grew older, the family's financial situation gradually improved, yet they remained impoverished. In 1987, Reis' parents officially divorced.

Many years after Reis' father abandoned the family and as Reis began to become well-known in Hong Kong, he tried to contact Reis by phone, asking for money. Despite her worries about his deteriorating health, she had no intention of reconnecting. Years later, Reis recalled the phone call, which she found hurtful.

Reis' father died at the Prince of Wales Hospital in Hong Kong on 22 August 1995 after fighting a blood disorder for eight months. She attended his funeral.

Education
Reis had excellent results when she attended Maryknoll Convent School, receiving a 2A (English, Bible) result and ranking 7B in her five-year secondary education graduation exam. She participated in the Hong Kong Certificate of Education Examination shortly after she won the 1988 Miss Hong Kong Pageant.

Career

Beauty queen career and early actress career (1988-1993) 

In 1988, after encouragement from others, Reis auditioned for the 1988 Miss Hong Kong Pageant. She was predicted to win the "Best Photogenic Award", which gave Reis the self-confidence to continue on this career path. However, Sheila Chin won the "Best Photogenic Award" instead. She reportedly cried after leaving the stage.  However, her mother's words reminded Reis that the road to success was difficult and that there would be many setbacks in the future on this career path, which proved highly influential and inspirational to Reis, encouraging her to press ahead with the Miss Hong Kong Pageant. The competition between Reis and Sheila Chin was tense in the pageant and was "neck-to-neck". Reis won the pageant, becoming Miss Hong Kong 1988 at the age of 18 and winning the contest's "Miss International Goodwill" title. While both women would soon receive entertainment careers, with both taking a direction towards acting, Reis would, by the mid-1990s, ultimately become a more acclaimed celebrity than Chin, with distinctive film roles. Later that year, in late 1988, Reis would also become the first Miss Chinese International and was awarded the "Best Photogenic Award". Following her Miss Chinese International crowning, she participated in the Miss World 1988 pageant in London, where she promoted the image of Hong Kong. Continuing her newfound status as an acclaimed beauty queen, Reis was then supposed to compete in the Miss Universe 1989 pageant but withdrew due to health problems, citing "personal reasons".   

Reis would later reveal in 1998 that her beauty queen career proved to be a difficult time for her, stating: “The Miss Hong Kong time was very confusing for me. I wouldn’t have the courage to do it again.”  After spending a year as the “Miss International Goodwill” Ambassador, a title she received from the Miss Hong Kong 1988 pageant, Reis later remarked that she  “wasn’t sure what I would do after it.”  As is customary for many Miss Hong Kong winners, Reis would receive a career offer from TVB - with Mona Fong, the Deputy Chairman and General Manager of TVB, personally stepping forward and trying her best to persuade Reis to sign a contract. Fong offered Reis very favorable conditions, such as not pushing Reis to star in the TV station's low budget series, which is what usually happens with new, young faces in TVB, as well as offering Reis more beyond a normal monthly salary. As such, Reis soon appeared in a 5-episode TVB drama series called “I Do I Do” (花月佳期), which aired in late March 1989. While the drama is fairly unremarkable, it marked the first acting role of Reis, who had had no formal acting training when she was offered a contract by TVB, and later remarked that filming the series “seemed like the right thing to do.” In 1990, having first worked in commercials, appearing in music videos and then on TVB television episodes, Reis made her formal entry into showbiz with her first film roles such as Declaration Of Help (1990) - her film debut - and although a newcomer to films, played a role such as the “rebel sister” Yuet Chi / Moon in her second film, A Chinese Ghost Story Part II (1990). That year, she would also go on to star in comedies like No Risk, No Gain (1990), starring as Winnie, and as a streetwise tough beauty in Perfect Girls (1990). Her next films, in the years 1990-1993 would mostly be comedies, and she would often play roles dependent on her beauty. As such, she would to some degree cultivate an idol image, starring in popular films such as The Banquet (1991), Royal Tramp II (1992), and replacing Cecilia Yip in starring as the tomboyish disciple Kiddo in Swordsman II (1992) - starring alongside her favourite actress Brigitte Lin. Reis would also star in A Kid From Tibet (1992). However, Reis also starred in some roles in this early part of her acting career that would distinctly represent her acting style, and bring her out as an actress. These included starring as “Windy” in the anime-inspired, science-fiction future noir The Wicked City (1992), where her full-mouthed looks were deemed just right for the anime-inspired film, and her performance as an actress was brought out significantly in a way previously not before. Telling a story of conflicts and relationship between demon-like creatures and humans in 1990s Hong Kong, the film was a big success, being one of the most popular Tsui Hark productions in the USA and Europe, and still playing in festivals and midnight screenings around the USA and Europe. Reis would also dominate the film’s promotional material.

Actress breakthrough (1993-1995) 

By the dawn of the mid-1990s however, most of Reis’ film roles, with the exception of a few notable, acclaimed roles,  had been relatively undemanding, being mainly known for her minor girl-next-door, “nice girl” roles, and she was often only used for simply window dressing, a common phenomenon amongst good-looking talents in Hong Kong’s entertainment industry. Ambitious and wishing to attempt further, more elaborate roles with greater complexity, such as successful women, women with sex appeal, editresses or “mad women”, Reis expanded the scope of her acting career significantly from 1993. Starring in Jet Li’s movie The Legend of Fong Sai Yuk (1993), she starred as the beautiful Ting-Ting. The film was a box office hit and Reis then starred in its sequel released later that year, Fong Sai-Yuk II (1993). Moving into television, Reis began to increase the complexity of her roles as she so desired, starring as the beautiful and deceptive top agent of a doomsday cult in the cross-genre TVB drama The Legendary Ranger (1993) alongside her good friend Leon Lai. The drama’s eclectic setting and merger of wuxia, science fiction and fantasy genres, as well as its visual aesthetic was considered at the time groundbreaking in Hong Kong, and the demented mixture of beauty and darkness in the acting material Reis worked with cemented her signature acting style. In The Black Morning Glory (1993), Reis was to establish her acting style a step further - playing a complex dual-role as a professional killer employed by the Japanese Yakuza. The film also dealt into the mental complexity of Reis’ character, with a drama-based storyline that sees her character fend off the police and Yakuza while also attempting to reconcile with her own turmoil after she realises who she has killed. The film would then go on to serve as premise for Reis starring in The Other Side Of The Sea (1994), where Reis would again portray a cold-blooded professional killer who must reckon with going on the run and betrayal after becoming disillusioned with a life of killing.

By 1995, Reis would star again alongside Leon Lai; this time in Wong Kar-wai’s neo-noir crime thriller Fallen Angels (1995), playing a sexually frustrated, jealous, cold-blooded hitman’s assistant. Reis’ character was a notable departure from her earlier roles, allowing herself to be filmed at fisheye lens angles, in grungy colours and with an appearance that was glamorously-dressed, stylish, and decidedly grunge, an appearance that would become emblematic of Reis’ style, but at times also dishevelled in contrast to the polished appearance of her Miss Hong Kong days. Reis’ character was described as a “chain-smoking, quivering, obsessive mess who faxes kill-plans and masturbates in PVC fetish dresses”, and was also interpreted as a ironic depiction of supermodel glamour or MTV music videos. Fully declaring herself as an actress, and breaking away completely from any kind of innocent or clean-cut image in a way that likely shocked many of her fans, Reis received critical acclaim for her portrayal of the role and immediately established herself as an A-list actress, becoming amongst Hong Kong’s most famous actresses. Fallen Angels would go on to become a cult classic of the “Golden Age” of Hong Kong cinema, and Reis’ film character would also become a cult film character  and a grunge icon - a reputation Reis has continued to have to this day. The role would also establish Reis as having fame beyond the Chinese-speaking world, becoming her most well-known role outside of the Chinese-speaking world. The role has often been called as the “bravest film choice” in Reis’ film career,  marking a moment where she began to build a reputation for starring in introspective and high-quality movies, and by far her most iconic role - it has also been called her “very best performance”.

Continued film and modelling success (1995-early 2000s) 
After the success of Fallen Angels, Reis’ film output began to fall dramatically, with only 8 films over the next 5 years, representing how she was only willing to only star in higher-quality movies with more challenging film roles, though she continued to pick up large success in her modelling work. In 1996, she starred as Laura in July 13th (1996), a horror film about mental problems, suicide, and sleepless pressure in the chaos of Hong Kong city life. In 1997, Reis starred in the action sci-fi mystery thriller Armageddon (1997) as Adele, Andy Lau’s character’s dead fiancé. The film was visually and thematically a departure from many other works in Hong Kong cinema at the time, and she also starred in Young And Dangerous IV (1997), the fourth film in the hugely-popular Young and Dangerous series of films. By the late 1990s, Reis’ career was also taking her abroad for further success - Reis was so popular in Japan that she was able to pick up “millions” from a day’s work of working in Tokyo, and she was also doing a lot of advertising work in Los Angeles.

Around the 21st century, Reis began to withdraw from acting to focus on family and charity businesses whilst making occasional public appearances. Her last role to date was 2009's Bodyguards and Assassins.

On 25 December 2021, Reis made an appearance as a guest/main judge on HK Television Entertainment's fourth season of the talent variety show King Maker (Chinese: 全民造星IV), sparking internet discussion and hype.

Personal life
On 23 November 2008, following a public two-year courtship, Reis married business tycoon Julian Hui, son of real-estate billionaire Hui Sai Fun (1921–2018). Their son Jayden Max Hui was born on 8 February 2011. His initials are derived from the first initials, "J" and "M", of his parents' names.

In 2007, a viral audio of Reis and business tycoon Joseph Lau leaked onto the internet caused controversy, in which Reis and Lau had a heated argument regarding actresses he had signed, including Ada Choi and Catherine Hung. Reis' use of profanity directed at Lau led netizens to imply the two to be in a relationship and being able to swear profusely behind his wife's back during that time, although the quality and time has indicated it originated from the 90s. Reis' famous line "I'm really gonna congratulate you/I give my congratulations!" is often used by people nowadays as a sarcastic manner online or in real life. 

On 15 January 2022, Reis was rushed to ICU after a near death experience due to breathing complications.

Partial filmography
Sources:

No Risk, No Gain (1990) - Winnie
A Chinese Ghost Story Part II (1990) - Yuet Chi / Moon
Perfect Girls (1990) - Lo Hsaio-Hsiao
Qiang qian xiong di zhi zei yu shi da e (1990)
Doctor's Heart (1990) - Anita Yeung
Party of a Wealthy Family (1991) - Kar-Yan Li
A Kid from Tibet (1991) - Chiu Seng-Neng
Swordsman II (1992) - Kiddo
Casino Tycoon II (1992) - Ti Yun
Royal Tramp II (1992) - Li Ming-ke / A-ke
Zen of Sword (1992) - Princess Choi Siu-Ling
The Wicked City (1992) - Wan-Gei
The Legend of Fong Sai Yuk (1993) - Ting Ting
The Sword of Many Loves (1993) - Ching Ling
The Black Morning Glory (1993) - Michelle Lam Man-Ting / Fan Lin
The Legend of Fong Sai Yuk II (1993) - Ting Ting
Drunken Master III (1994) - Sum Yu
The Other Side of the Sea (1994) - Yip Man-Sau
Fallen Angels (1995) - The Killer's Agent
100 Ways to Kill Yourself (1996) - Laura
Heaven Earth Great Ambition (1997) - Adele
Young and Dangerous 4 (1997) - Lee Yan-Kin
Flowers of Shanghai (1998) - Emerald
Prince Charming (1999) - 'Ice' Poa
Round About Midnight (1999) - Linda
The Island Tales (2000) - Sharon
When I Fall in Love... with Both (2000) - Cecilia / Xixi (Chinese pinyin transliteration)
The City of Strangers (2000) - Jackie Fong
Healing Hearts (2000) - Kei
Bakery Amour (2001) - Lok To
Every Dog Has His Date (2001) - Sharon Lee
Beauty and the Breast (2002) - Yuki
The Irresistible Piggies (2002) - Mo
Miss Du Shi Niang (2003) - Lady Ten
Bodyguards and Assassins (2009) - Prince Lau's lover (final film role)

Name as a wordplay

Awards and nominations

See also
 Cinema of Hong Kong
 Macanese people
 Macanese language

Notes

References

External links
 
 hkcinemagic entry

1970 births
Living people
Miss World 1988 delegates
Miss Hong Kong winners
Miss Chinese International winners
20th-century Hong Kong actresses
21st-century Hong Kong actresses
Hong Kong female models
Hong Kong beauty pageant winners
Hong Kong Roman Catholics
Hong Kong people of Macanese descent
Hong Kong people of Portuguese descent
Macau emigrants to Hong Kong
Macau people
Macanese people
Hong Kong film actresses
Macanese film actresses